Haq Nawaz Jhangvi (Ḥaq Nawāz Jhangvī; 1952 – 23 February 1990) was a Pakistani cleric who founded the Anjumane Sipahe Sahaba on 6 September 1986.

Biography
Haq Nawaz Jhangvi was born in 1952 in Chela, a village in the Jhang District of Punjab, Pakistan, into a small land-holding family of the Jat-Sipra clan, and he memorized the Qur'an by heart in two years before studying Qur'anic recitation and Arabic grammar and pursuing higher Islamic studies at the Darul Ulum Kabirwala, where he spent five years, and Khair ul Madariss Multan, where he spent seven years mainly focusing on hadith, becoming an imam at a Toba Tek Singh mosque and later a khatib in a Jhang mosque, in 1973.

Jhangvi joined the Jamiat Ulama-e-Islam during that time, and before he began focusing his preaching against Shia, he was active in the Khatm-i Nabuwwat movement against Ahmadis.

After the 1979 Iranian Revolution, Jhangvi began attacking the Iran by accusing it of exporting its revolution. He directed his attacks against Shia beliefs and civilians, as well as against Ayatollah Khomeini, Iran's Supreme Leader. Locally, he targeted the Shah Jewna family and the district administration and became extremely popular among local residents.

Jhangvi also began preaching and became popular among Sunnis, who were willing to support him in his cause. He became vocal against local Shias. Jhangvi founded Anjuman-i Sipah-i Sahabah in Jhang on 6 September 1985.

On 23 February 1990, Jhangvi was assassinated by suspected Shia militants.

Legacy
SSP members Riaz Basra and Akram Lahori formed their own organization in 1996, Lashkar-e-Jhangvi, named after Jhangvi, a group known as one of the most lethal sectarian groups in Pakistan.

Masood Azhar, a radical Islamic scholar and one of the most wanted men by India for his activities, has been described as "an old devotee of Maulana Haq Nawaz Jhangvi."

His son Masroor Nawaz Jhangvi is also a politician and want to continue his father's legacy, but describes himself as less sectarian when it comes to the Shias.

Bibliography

Authored works
K̲h̲ut̤bāt-i amīr-i ʻazīmat : bānī-i Sipāh-i Ṣaḥābah Maulānā Ḥaq Navāz Jhangvī kī maʻrikatulārāʼ taqārīr kā majmūʻah. Collections of speeches in many volumes collected by S̲anāʼullāh Sʻad Shujāʻābādī.

Books about him
Maz̲hab ahl al-Sunnat va-al-Jamāʻat aur Maulānā Ḥaq Navāz Jhangvī kī shahādat by Qāẓī Maz̤har Ḥusain, 32 p. On his death.
Amīr-i ʻAzīmat : ḥayāt by Muḥammad Ilyās Bālākoṭī, 319 p. Biography.

See also
 Azam Tariq
 Isar-ul-Haq Qasmi
Malik Ishaq
Moavia Azam Tariq
Masroor Nawaz Jhangvi
Riaz Basra

References

1952 births
1990 deaths
Assassinated religious leaders
Pakistani religious leaders
People from Jhang District
Deobandis
History of Islam in Pakistan
Religiously motivated violence in Pakistan
Shia–Sunni sectarian violence
Critics of Ahmadiyya
Critics of Shia Islam
Pakistani Islamists
Pakistani far-right politicians
Sipah-e-Sahaba Pakistan people
Chiefs of Sipah-e-Sahaba Pakistan